

Highest-grossing films

List of films
A list of films produced in Japan in 2009 (see 2009 in film):

References

External links
 Japanese films of 2009 at the Internet Movie Database
 2009 in Japan
 2009 in Japanese television
 List of 2009 box office number-one films in Japan

2009
Japanese
Films